The E el-2 (Cyrillic script: Ээл2) was a Soviet diesel-electric locomotive designed by Yury Lomonosov and built in Germany.  The work was started by Hohenzollern Locomotive Works in Germany but, for political reasons, it was later transferred to Maschinenfabrik Esslingen. The locomotive was completed in 1924. On January 20, 1925 it was transferred to the USSR and presented to the press and officials. The rest of that year it spent on several mainline routes and then worked mostly between Moscow and Kursk, Russian SFSR, but later moved to Ashkhabad (Ashgabat, Turkmenistan). Despite some technical troubles in the early years of service, it underwent several modifications and lasted until 1954, running about a million kilometers in total.

Powertrain
The prime mover was an MAN submarine-type diesel engine, weighing 26 tonnes, and there were five traction motors, one for each driving axle. A semi-flexible coupling was installed between the diesel engine and the generator.

References

Railway locomotives introduced in 1924
E el-2
5 ft gauge locomotives
1′Eo1′ locomotives